Denis Hamson Obua (born 6 February 1980), is a Ugandan politician, who serves as the Government Chief Whip, a position he was appointed to on 21st July 2022. The office was officially handed over to him on 16th August 2022. He previously served as Minister of State for Sports, in the Cabinet of Uganda, effective 14 December 2019. He also concurrently serves as the incumbent Member of Parliament representing Ajuri County, Alebtong District in the 11th Parliament (2021 to 2026), a seat he also held in the 10th Parliament (2016 to 2021).

Background and education
He was born in Alebtong District on 6 February 1980. He attended Inomo Primary School, before transferring to Lango College, in Lira, where he completed both his
O-Level and A-Level education, and obtained his Uganda Certificate of Education in 1997 and a Uganda Advanced Certificate of Education, in 1999.

He has a Diploma in Law and a Certificate in Administrative Law, both obtained from the Law Development Centre, in Kampala, Uganda's capital city. His Bachelor of Arts in Social Work and Social Administration was obtained from Uganda Christian University, in Mukono. His Master of Public Administration degree was awarded by Uganda Management Institute in 2016.

Career
From 2000 until 2003, Denis was employed as a contracts clerk at British American Tobacco. For the next two years, he served as a legal assistant at Atim and Company Advocates. He was then hired as a Senior Clerical Officer, responsible for legal duties, in the Office of the Vice President of Uganda, serving in that capacity from 2005 until 2006.

In 2006, he was elected to the 8th Parliament (2006 - 2011), Youth Member of Parliament representing Northern Uganda. In 2011 he was elected to represent the newly created Ajuri County in 9th Parliament. He was re-elected in 2016, 2021 and he is the incumbent MP.
In a cabinet reshuffle, on 14 December 2019, Denis Obua was named to the cabinet. He replaced Charles Bakkabulindi, who was dropped from cabinet. After parliamentary approval, he swore in as State Minister for Sports, on 13 January 2020. Obua was chosen to be the Government chief whip and on 16th August 2022, He took over office.

Family
Denis Hamson Obua is married.

See also
Parliament of Uganda

References

External links
Website of the Uganda Ministry of Education and Sports

1980 births
Living people
Ugandan civil servants
Uganda Management Institute alumni
Law Development Centre alumni
People from Alebtong District
People from Northern Region, Uganda
Government ministers of Uganda
Uganda Christian University alumni
Members of the Parliament of Uganda
National Resistance Movement politicians